Piz dal Fuorn (2,906 m) is a mountain in the Sesvenna Range of the Alps, overlooking Il Fuorn (east of Zernez) in the canton of Graubünden.

References

External links
 Piz dal Fuorn on Hikr

Mountains of the Alps
Mountains of Graubünden
Mountains of Switzerland
Zernez